Donato Antonio "Don" Nardella (born 9 November 1958) is an Australian politician. He was a member of the Parliament of Victoria from 1992 until 2018, representing Melbourne North Province in the Legislative Council (1992-1999) and Melton in the Legislative Assembly (1999–2018). He was a member of the Labor Party from 1992 until 2017, when he was forced to resign from the Labor caucus over an expenses scandal; he then sat in parliament as an independent.

Nardella was born in the Melbourne suburb of Footscray, and received First Class Welder Certificates in the early 1980s. In 1981 he received a licence as a crane driver and chaser. He became a Labor Party state organiser in 1985, and remained prominent in the union movement as a member of the Municipal Executive.

In 1992, Nardella was elected to the Victorian Legislative Council on the Labor ticket for Melbourne North Province. He was appointed Shadow Minister for Aged Care and Shadow Minister Assisting on Workcover in 1995, exchanging Aged Care for Consumer Affairs in 1999. In that year he transferred to the lower house, winning the safe seat of Melton.

In December 2014, Nardella was elected Deputy Speaker of the Legislative Assembly, under Speaker Telmo Languiller. In February 2017, Languiller was found to have been claiming a second residence allowance for a house in Queenscliff, and later resigned his position. Questioned by the media about the allowance, Nardella conceded he had claimed around $100,000 of the same allowance for a house in Ocean Grove, and announced he would resign as deputy speaker on the same day as Languiller. On 28 February 2017, Nardella announced he would retire from politics at the next state election. Premier Daniel Andrews demanded that Nardella repay the $100,000 he had claimed, which he refused to do; accordingly Andrews demanded his resignation from the Labor Party, and Nardella resigned to sit as an independent on 7 March 2017.

References

External links
 Parliamentary voting record of Don Nardella at Victorian Parliament Tracker
 

1958 births
Living people
Australian Labor Party members of the Parliament of Victoria
Independent members of the Parliament of Victoria
Members of the Victorian Legislative Assembly
Australian politicians of Italian descent
Crane operators
20th-century Australian politicians
21st-century Australian politicians
People from Footscray, Victoria
Politicians from Melbourne